Britannia Row Studios was a recording studio located in Islington, London N1 (1975–1995), and then Fulham, London SW6, England (1995–2015). The original studio was built by the British rock band Pink Floyd in a three-story block at 35 Britannia Row, Islington, London N1, after their 1975 album Wish You Were Here was released. Pink Floyd used the studio to record their album Animals and parts of The Wall, including the school chorus on "Another Brick in the Wall".

Pink Floyd's drummer, Nick Mason, eventually assumed ownership of the studio. In the early 1990s, he sold the business to Kate Koumi, who had been managing it since the mid-1980s. Koumi relocated the studio in 1995 to Wandsworth Bridge Road in Fulham, where it operated for the next 20 years. It closed in September 2015 and was converted into flats.

Mason retained the original building in Britannia Row, which was developed as serviced offices. In 2012 some of it, including the original studio spaces, was being used as a training facility for the London School of Sound. In 2016, Islington Council granted permission for an extension and conversion of the building into flats with limited office space.

An audio equipment rental company, Britannia Row Productions, originally based at Britannia Row, was created to hire out Pink Floyd's tour equipment and keep the skills of its crew together. Early events that it provided sound for included Queen's 1976 show in Hyde Park, with an audience of over 150,000. Pink Floyd sold Britannia Row Productions to its managers in 1985, and it is now based in Twickenham.

Artists 
The studio was used by artists including:

 Richard Ashcroft
 Atomic Kitten
 Bijelo Dugme
 Björk
 James Blunt
 Kate Bush
 Roy Harper
 Catherine Wheel
 Coil
 The Cult
 Pete Doherty
 Jack DeJohnette 
 Joy Division
 Ronan Keating
 Liberty X
 Manic Street Preachers
 Michael Mantler 
 Dannii Minogue
 Kylie Minogue
 Kate Nash
 Nash the Slash
 New Order
 Page and Plant
 The Pillows
 Pink Floyd
 Pulp
 Cozy Powell
 Section 25
 Skindred
 Snow Patrol
 Sugababes
 Supergrass
 Westlife
 Whitesnake

References

External links
 Former  (via archive.org)

Recording studios in London
Former buildings and structures in the London Borough of Islington
Buildings and structures in the London Borough of Hammersmith and Fulham
Media and communications in the London Borough of Hammersmith and Fulham